Republican Party is a name used by many political parties around the world, though the term most commonly refers to the United States' Republican Party.

Republican Party may also refer to:

Africa
Republican Party (Liberia)
Republican Party (Malawi)
Republican Party (Namibia)
Republican Party (Tunisia)

Americas

Brazil
Republicanos
Party of the Republic, in Brazil
Republican Party (Brazil), active 1945–1965
Republican Party of São Paulo, active in Brazil 1873–1937
Republican Party of the Social Order, in Brazil

Chile
Republican Party (Chile, 2019)
Republican Party (Chile, 1982), active in Chile 1982-1987

United States
 Republican Party (United States), the current major party; active since 1854
American Republican Party (1843), active circa 1840s
Democratic-Republican Party, active circa 1790s–1820s
Liberal Republican Party (United States), active 1872
National Republican Party, active circa 1820s
Puerto Rico Republican Party

Other Republican Parties in the Americas
Republican Party (Canada)
Republican Party (Jamaica)

Asia

India
Republican Party of India
Factions, splinter groups and attempts at unification: 
Republican Party of India (Athawale)
Republican Party of India (Gavai)
Peoples Republican Party
Republican Party of India (Democratic)
Republican Party of India (Kamble)
Republican Party of India (Khobragade)
Republican Party of India (United)

Other Republican Parties in Asia
Republican Party of Afghanistan
Republican Party (Cambodia)
Republican Party (China)
Republican Party (East Timor)
Islamic Republican Party, in Iran
Republican Party (Maldives)
Mongolian Republican Party
Civic Will – Republican Party, in Mongolia
Republican Turkish Party, in Northern Cyprus
Republican Party (Pakistan)
Republican Party (Philippines)

Europe

France
Republican, Radical and Radical-Socialist Party
Independent Republicans
Republican Party (France)
Rally for the Republic
Democratic Republican Alliance
The Republicans (France)

Iceland
Republican Party (Iceland, 1953)
Republican Party (Iceland, 2013)

Ireland
Fianna Fáil, full name Fianna Fáil – The Republican Party, in Ireland
Republican Sinn Féin
Sinn Féin

Italy
European Republicans Movement
Italian Republican Party
The Republicans (Italy)

Other Republican Parties in Europe
Republican Party of Albania
Republican Party of Armenia
Republican Party (Bosnia and Herzegovina)
Republic of Bulgaria (Bulgaria)
Republican Party of Farmers and Peasants (Czechoslovakia)
Rally for the Republic – Republican Party of Czechoslovakia (Czechoslovakia, now Czech Republic)
Republican Party (Estonia)
Republic (Faroe Islands)
Republican Party of Georgia
The Republicans (Germany)
Republican Party (Hungary)
Republican Party of Moldova
The Republicans (Poland)
Portuguese Republican Party
Republican Party (Romania)
Republican Party (Turkey)
Republican Party of the Russian Federation
Yugoslav Republican Party

Oceania
Republican Party of Australia
Republican Party of Guam
New Zealand Republican Party (1967)
New Zealand Republican Party (1995)
Republican Party (Northern Mariana Islands)
Vanuatu Republican Party

See also
Republican (disambiguation)
Republican People's Party (disambiguation)
People's Republican Party (disambiguation)
Republicanism, an ideology of being a citizen in a state as a republic under which the people hold popular sovereignty
Republican Alternative Party (disambiguation)
Republican Liberal Party (disambiguation)